The Port Arthur, Duluth and Western Railway (PADW) was a Canadian railway that operated in Northwestern Ontario.

The PADW was built in 1889 by investors interested in extracting the mineral and timber wealth of the Whitefish River Valley, Silver Mountain Range and beyond into the Gunflint Range.

The line originated at Port Arthur in the east, ran through Fort William and onward to the Canada–United States border.  The PADW was constructed with the intention of connecting to an affiliated railroad in Minnesota to provide a route to Duluth, however this section was not built.

The PADW was abandoned in sections, and fully closed in 1938.

See also 

 Gunflint and Lake Superior Railroad
 Canadian Northern Railway
 List of Ontario railways
 List of defunct Canadian railways

References

Defunct Ontario railways
History of Thunder Bay
Rail transport in Thunder Bay
Rail transport in Thunder Bay District
Defunct Minnesota railroads
1889 establishments in Ontario
1938 disestablishments in Ontario
Canadian companies established in 1889
Railway companies established in 1889